Vilhjálmur Hjálmarsson (20 September 1914 – 14 July 2014) was an Icelandic politician and former minister.

External links 

 Non auto-biography of Vilhjálmur Hjálmarsson on the parliament website

1914 births
2014 deaths
Vilhjalmur Hjalmarsson
Vilhjalmur Hjalmarsson